Alan Knight may refer to:

Alan Knight (academic) (1949–2017), Australian academic and professor of journalism and media studies
Alan Knight (Australian footballer) (born 1936), Australian rules footballer
Alan Knight (bishop) (1904–1979), Bishop of Guyana and Primate of the West Indies
Alan Knight (footballer, born 1961), English footballer, played a record number of games as goalkeeper for Portsmouth FC
Alan Knight (historian) (born 1946), British academic historian of Latin America studies at St. Antony's College Oxford, specialist in the history of Mexico